The City of Hialeah Educational Academy, also known as COHEA Career and Collegiate Academy is a public charter school in Hialeah, Florida. 

The school serves middle and high school students from 6th to 12th grade. The curriculum is designed with college prep in mind and has a STEM influence, although emphasizes emergency response, health, and law enforcement career paths. The school is located on a college-style campus. 

COHEA has been nationally recognized by Newsweek magazine, was named U.S. News & World Reports Best High Schools Silver Award, and was ranked on The Daily Beast's 2014 list of top high schools in the U.S. Due to the school's high level of free and reduced lunches, the school was also ranked among the most transformative schools in the country. COHEA is an "A" school under the State of Florida Accountability Program and is fully accredited by AdvancED under the Southern Association of Colleges and Schools Council on Accreditation and School Improvement (SACS-CASI) division.

References

2008 establishments in Florida
Charter schools in Florida
Educational institutions established in 2008
Middle schools in Miami-Dade County, Florida
Public high schools in Miami-Dade County, Florida
Public middle schools in Florida
Public schools in Miami-Dade County, Florida
Education in Hialeah, Florida